The men's 30 kilometre freestyle at the 1999 Asian Winter Games was held on February 4, 1999 at Yongpyong Cross Country Venue, South Korea.

Schedule
All times are Korea Standard Time (UTC+09:00)

Results
Legend
DNF — Did not finish
DNS — Did not start

References

Results

External links
Results FIS

Men 30